Houston County Airport  is a public airport located three miles (5 km) southeast of the central business district of Crockett, in Houston County, Texas, United States. It is owned by Houston County.

Although most U.S. airports use the same three-letter location identifier for the FAA and IATA, Houston County Airport is assigned DKR by the FAA but has no designation from the IATA (which assigned DKR to Dakar-Yoff-Léopold Sédar Senghor International Airport in Dakar, Senegal).

Facilities and aircraft 
For the 12-month period ending July 25, 2005, the airport had 6,600 aircraft operations, 100% of which were general aviation.

References

External links 

Airports in Texas
Transportation in Houston County, Texas
Buildings and structures in Houston County, Texas